Fan Girl is a 2015 American teen comedy film directed by Paul Jarrett. It had its world premiere at the LA Film Festival on June 15, 2015, before airing on ABC Family on October 3, 2015. The film stars Kiernan Shipka as Telulah Farrow, Meg Ryan as Telulah's mother, Mary Farrow, and the pop punk band All Time Low as themselves.

Premise
A high school sophomore with a passion for filmmaking sets out to make a film about her favorite band, All Time Low, and enter it in her school's film competition.

Cast

References

External links
 

2015 films
2015 comedy films
2015 independent films
2010s American films
2010s English-language films
2010s high school films
2010s teen comedy films
American high school films
American independent films
American teen comedy films
Films about musical groups